Diesel Loco Shed, Ludhiana is a motive power depot performing locomotive maintenance and repair facility for diesel locomotives of the Indian Railways, located at Ludhiana of the Northern Railway zone in Punjab, India.

History 
The shed was opened in 1977.

Operation
Initially, the shed handed only WDM-2 and WDS-6 class locomotives, but gradually were allocated WDM-3As, WDG-3As
Being one of the three diesel engine sheds in Northern Railway, various major and minor maintenance schedules of diesel locomotives are carried out here. It has the sanctioned capacity of 175 engine units. Beyond the operating capacity, this shed houses a total of 198 engine units Like all locomotive sheds, LDH does regular maintenance, overhaul and repair including painting and washing of locomotives.

Markings
LDH loco shed has its own logo and stencils. It is written on loco's body side as well as front and back.

Locomotives

References

"GM Northern Railway participates in  17th Vendors Development Day" babushahi.com 15 May 2019
"Indian Railways turns 162 today" Hindustan Times  16 April 2015

External links
Diesel Engine Shed, Ludhiana Unofficial Facebook page

Ludhiana
Ludhiana district
Rail transport in Punjab, India
2001 establishments in Punjab, India